Pegu is an Indian surname mainly found in Assam.

Notable people 

Bhubon Pegu, Indian Politician
Rajib Lochan Pegu, Indian Politician
Ranoj Pegu,Indian Politician